Rubicon (also called "Rubicon Bay") is a former settlement in El Dorado County, California.

A post office operated at Rubicon from 1901 to 1906 and from 1909 to 1913.
In 2011, Rubicon received over 500 inches of snow.

Climate

References

Former settlements in El Dorado County, California
Former populated places in California